Jack Aldred Beaver (December 1, 1918 – July 2, 2012) served in the California State Assembly for the 73rd district from 1955 to 1963 and during World War II he served in the United States Army.

References

1918 births
2012 deaths
United States Army personnel of World War II
Members of the California State Legislature
United States Army soldiers
United States Army personnel of the Korean War